Utrecht University School of Economics (USE) is the Economics department of Utrecht University, in the Netherlands. The mission of USE is to contribute to an economy where people flourish. We enrich scientifically rigorous and societally relevant economics research and education with other disciplines to better solve problems and identify opportunities - the real world perspective. 

The department is divided into three different units:
 the Undergraduate School of Economics, which offers bachelor’s programmes
 the Graduate School of Economics, which offers Masters in Economics
 the U.S.E. Research Institute (RI), which conducts academic research and supervises research master's programmes  (MPhil).

Programmes

Bachelors

Bsc in Economics and Business Economics
The Bsc in Economics and Business Economics is a three-year programme taught in English. In the three-year bachelor's programme, all students will start with a number of basic courses that together constitute the required part of the curriculum. After completing these courses they can specialize in a subject of their choice: Financial-Monetary Economics, Business & Management, International Economics, Labour & Organisation, Economics & Politics or the Firm and Competition Apart from this, USE offers a unique curriculum, giving students the opportunity to combine their study of Economics with especially compiled courses in Law, Social Sciences, Geography, Psychology or History.

Masters

Banking and Finance
In the Master in Banking and Finance you will focus on: investment banking in international financial markets, regulation of banks and other financial institutions worldwide, central bank policies and commercial banks’ strategic, allocation, funding and investment decisions, risk management and the sustainability of financial systems and investments.

Business and Social Impact 
In this Master’s in Business and Social Impact, you will focus on :The role of business in today’s society; Understanding and appreciating the wider context of business and business ecosystems, along with the various stakeholders; Developing strategies for doing business for society, in connection with the UN Sustainable Development Goals (SDGs); Dealing with the challenges, opportunities, tensions and dilemmas that come with combining financial and social value; The role of marketing in doing business; Obtaining and managing finance for business that combines financial and social goals.

Business Development and Entrepreneurship 
In the Master in Business Development and Entrepreneurship you focus on: venture development, creating the right environment and context for new ventures to thrive; capturing value from innovation; product and service development; entrepreneurial marketing using methods like co-creation with customers and design thinking; obtaining and managing (venture) capital.

Economic Policy
In the Master in Economic Policy you focus on the role of government policies in complex societal issues such as care and insurance, sustainable economic growth, and energy transition; applying modern economics to societal questions such as international policy competition, inequality, and the future of work.

International Management 
In the Master in International Management you will focus on: Effective and ethical management and leadership in a complex international environment; The interaction between economic policy, financial markets and institutions in an international business context; Strategy, corporate social responsibility, ethics and human behaviour, as key aspects of international management; The role culture and incentives play in the behaviour of managers, firms and governments in cross-border interactions; Developing the ability to effectively adapt and operate in any international working environment in many different fields and organisations.

Financial Management 
In the Master in Financial Management you will focus on: How to raise capital (i.e. issuing shares and bonds); How to allocate capital (capital and operational budgeting); How to manage short-term resources; How to deal with new alternative financing forms such as crowdfunding or fintech; How to manage different corporate risks; How to align individual motives to organisational motives via performance management and compensation systems; How to effectively introduce changes in financial management policies within organisations.

Strategy, Competition and Regulation
The Master’s in Strategy, Competition and Regulation provides you with: Knowledge and understanding of key competition challenges at the interface of private and public interests faced by international high-growth businesses and public regulators; The skills and expertise required to understand the strategic, economic and regulatory aspects of competition issues in markets, to evaluate such issues and to draft prospective plans to resolve or leverage such issues; and the ability to adopt a reasoned position in the strategic, economic and regulatory debate on the justifications, principles, practices, causes and consequences of the management, monitoring and regulation of markets and institutions.

Sustainable Finance and Investments 
Acquiring the fundamental finance knowledge and tools you can use to assess the returns, risks and value of investments; The sustainability risks and opportunities that financial professionals are experiencing – such as climate change, resource scarcity, social inequality and stakeholder well-being; Implementing sustainable and ‘impact investments’; Measuring the financial performance and social impact of investments; The pros and cons of using ESG metrics in the financial analysis of companies, investing and shareholder engagement; What externally financed companies can do to identify, prioritise and report on material sustainability issues; and Learning from finance and related disciplines on how the financial sector can promote the transition to a more sustainable economy and society.

Research Master: Multidisciplinary Economics 
In the Research Master in Multidisciplinary Economics you will focus on: compulsory first-year courses designed to give you a solid foundation in economics necessary to conduct economic research and analysis; looking at economic problems from the perspectives of other disciplines; a second year that you can tailor with elective courses that match your personal areas of research interest, to be chosen from a list of U.S.E. electives, complemented with electives from other research masters at UU, and with electives from the University of Groningen; developing interpersonal and social skills in a highly international programme by working closely with fellow students; the development of essential research skills such as data handling, academic writing, and presentation.

Msc in Economics: Education and Communication
This final Master is not provided by Utrecht School of Economics, but by the Center of Education and Learning of the Utrecht University, in corporation with USE and Utrecht Graduate School of Law. This English taught master's programme leads to a full secondary school teaching qualification in the Netherlands. During the course, students will undertake teaching rounds at different types of secondary schools or in a higher education institution, both in the Netherlands and abroad.

The programme takes two years to complete. The basic entry requirement for the Dutch variant is a bachelor's degree in Economics. For the international variant of the course, U-TEAch (Utrecht Teacher Education Academy), the entry requirements are more stringent.

Exchange Programmes
The Utrecht University School of Economics has exchange agreements with 27 partner universities offering students the opportunity to study one or two semesters at one of the following universities:

Austria
Australia
Czech Republic
Denmark
France
Germany
Greece
Hong Kong
Italy
Kazakhstan
Latvia
Poland
Peru
Singapore
Slovenia
Spain
Thailand
United States of America

Study Association

ECU'92 is the study organization for all students who study economics at USE. They represent students, participate in the decision-making of the department and organize social, academic and career related events, often in partnership with the university. It is one of the largest study associations in Utrecht. The association has about 1800 members, approximately 130 of which are active in committees. Important political figures or executives have attended the ECU'92 conference throughout the years. Job fairs offer a convenient place for USE students to meet Dutch companies and get a first interview. Finally, ECU'92 publishes The Ecunomist, which name is a nod to the British weekly magazine The Economist.

Notes

External links 
 Utrecht University School of Economics homepage

Economics schools
Utrecht University